Dream/Killer, stylized onscreen as dream/killer, is a 2015 documentary film about the wrongful conviction of Ryan Ferguson based on the testimony of a classmate who said that he’d dreamt that Ferguson was the killer.  The film details the case and Bill Ferguson's journey to free his son. It debuted at the 2015 Tribeca Film Festival. It aired in August 2016 as a two-hour special on the Investigation Discovery network. The documentary was later released on Netflix in 2019.

Persons featured
 Ryan W. Ferguson
 Bill Ferguson
 Leslie Ferguson
 Charles Erickson
 Kevin Crane
 Kathleen Zellner

Synopsis
dream/killer details the wrongful conviction of Ryan Ferguson who spent ten years in prison before having his conviction overturned. The film focuses on Ryan's father, Bill, as he pursues a campaign to keep public attention on Ryan's case and work with lawyers to appeal Ryan's conviction. The film documents the investigation into claims that Missouri prosecutor Kevin Crane pressured witnesses into implicating Ferguson as well as omitting evidence and using flawed interrogation techniques.

Reception
In The New York Times Ken Jaworowski wrote, "dream/killer remains fast-paced and frightening". Rolling Stone writes that the film "show(s) the corruptive nature of power and brutally slow machinations of the U.S. justice system". Robert Abele of the Los Angeles Times was critical of the film however, writing that it presented itself as "a genuinely awful story of bad cops, corrupt prosecution, incompetent defense and an appeals process marred by the blind upholding of convictions."

See also
 List of wrongful convictions in the United States
 Overturned convictions in the United States
 Innocence Project

References

External links
 
 
 

2015 documentary films
Documentary films about crime in the United States
Documentary films about law
American documentary films
Netflix original documentary films
2010s English-language films
2010s American films